Burdwan C.M.S. High School is a school in Burdwan, West Bengal, India, standing by the side of B.C. Road. The school is divided into four categories: KG Section, Primary, Secondary, Higher Secondary, offering school education from KG1 to Higher secondary(+2) to more than 2000 students in the town.

History 
In the 18th century after the beginning of British rule in India, in order to spread the English education, Missionaries established some societies which were mostly controlled by the Church. Church Missionary Society was one of them. Church Missionary Society established three schools in Burdwan, Krishnanagar and Jalpaigudi.

J.J Weitbreth, the head of the society at 1834 with the help of Burdwan Raj Mahatab Chandra and several other people founded an English school named Church Missionary Societies English School. The school was later upgraded to Junior High and then Higher Secondary. After 1947 Church Missionary Society handed over all responsibilities of the school to the local residents. Later after the establishment of West Bengal Board of Secondary Education, the school was registered under the board.

Sections

Higher Secondary and Secondary 
These two sections are run by the same administrator and form the main part of the High School. The secondary section starts from class 5 and offers studies up to class 10 at the end of which students are required to sit for the Board examination. The admission in class 5 is based on the performance in the admission test taken by the school authority. The medium of instruction for this section is Bengali and offers English as second language. However, students may choose Hindi or Sanskrit or Arabic as their third language in class 7 and 8.

Although there is no system of admission tests for the Higher Secondary section, admission to class 11 is based on marks or grades or percentage obtained in the secondary(or equivalent) examination. Students from other boards like ICSE may also opt for their Higher Secondary studies in this section. This section offers three traditional branches of Higher Secondary studies which are Arts, Science and Commerce. This section offers both English and Bengali as medium of instruction to the students.

Primary 
This section runs at the same campus but is controlled by different authority. This section offers primary education from class 1 to 4 under the affiliation of West Bengal Board of Primary Education.

KG Section 
This section runs at the same campus but maintains different timing. While the three other sections mainly starts from 10:45 a.m, KG section has its schedule in the morning. This section is not directly related to the other three sections and maintains its own staffs and authority.

References 

C.M.S High School

External links 
 C.M.S High School

Boys' schools in India
Primary schools in West Bengal
High schools and secondary schools in West Bengal
Schools in Bardhaman
Educational institutions established in 1834
1834 establishments in India